is a Japanese producer, who has worked on such projects as Serial Experiments Lain (a producer and story writer). He was a director for the Noel video game, worked on the Lain video game, and also on Wachenröder for the Sega Saturn. He first hired Yoshitoshi ABe, who would become a regular collaborator in the future on many other anime projects.

Anime involved in

Phantom Quest Corp. (1994), Assistant Producer
Hyper Doll (1995), Producer
Magical Project S (1996), Assistant Producer
Tenchi the Movie 2: The Daughter of Darkness (1997-08-07), Production Supporter
Serial Experiments Lain (1998), Original Concept & Story, Producer
Nazca (1998), Producer
The Legend of Black Heaven (1999), Music Producer
Amazing Nurse Nanako (1999), Producer
NieA 7 (2000), Producer
Hellsing (2001), Executive Producer
Haibane Renmei (2002), Producer
Texhnolyze (2003), Producer
Koi Kaze (2004), Producer
Ergo Proxy (2006), Music Producer
Hellsing Ultimate (2006), Producer
Shigurui: Death Frenzy (2007), Producer
Rideback (2009), Producer
Danganronpa: The Animation (2013), Executive producer

References

External links

 Yasuyuki Ueda at Media Arts Database 
Online interview of Ueda and ABe -(from SciFi.com)
Similar interview, focused on Lain

Japanese animators
Japanese animated film producers
Living people
Year of birth missing (living people)